Donauhalle Ulm is a multi-purpose indoor arena located in Ulm, Germany. The venue hosted four team handball matches for the 1972 Summer Olympics that were held in neighboring Munich.

Donauhalle also plays hosts to music concerts and conventions.

References
1972 Summer Olympics official report. Volume 1. Part 1. p. 121.
1972 Summer Olympics official report. Volume 3. p. 375.
Ulm.de profile. 

Venues of the 1972 Summer Olympics
Indoor arenas in Germany
Olympic handball venues
Sports venues in Baden-Württemberg
Buildings and structures in Ulm
Sport in Tübingen (region)